Joseph Branciforte (born 1985) is an American musician, composer, record producer, and Grammy-winning recording engineer. He is the founder of the greyfade record label.

Biography

Branciforte grew up in a suburb of New York City studying drums and piano. He began experimenting with recording and electronic music at an early age, before attending Berklee College of Music to study Electronic Production and Design.

After returning to New York, Branciforte began a career as a freelance recording engineer, working on albums for Ben Monder, Tim Berne, Vijay Iyer, Theo Bleckmann, Nels Cline, Craig Taborn, Marc Ribot, and JACK Quartet, among others.

In 2010, he formed the "garage-chamber" ensemble The Cellar and Point with guitarist Christopher Botta. The group's debut album, Ambit, which combined chamber writing for strings and vibraphone with experimental rock, jazz, and electronic elements, was issued in 2014 by Cuneiform. Dave Lynch of All Music Guide called the album "one of 2014's finest albums of challenging, engaging, and genre-defying contemporary music."

In 2019, Branciforte founded the greyfade record label. The label's inaugural release was LP1, a collaboration between vocalist Theo Bleckmann and Branciforte on modular synthesizer, Fender Rhodes, and electronic processing. In 2021, he collaborated with composer Kenneth Kirschner on an album featuring algorithmically composed pieces for chamber ensemble, From The Machine: Volume 1. He also won a Grammy and Latin Grammy award for his engineering on Eliane Elias's Mirror Mirror with Chick Corea in the Best Latin Jazz Album category.

Albums
 Kenneth Kirschner & Joseph Branciforte: From The Machine, Volume 1 (greyfade, 2021)
 Joseph Branciforte & Theo Bleckmann: LP1 (greyfade, 2019)
 The Cellar and Point: Ambit (Cunieform, 2014)

As engineer & producer
 Greg Davis: new primes (greyfade, 2022)
 Christopher Otto & JACK Quartet: rag'sma  (greyfade, 2021)
 Craig Taborn: Sixty x 60  (Pyroclastic, 2021)
 Eliane Elias, Chick Corea, & Chucho Valdez: Mirror, Mirror (Candid, 2021)
 Ben Monder, Tony Malaby, Tom Rainey: Live at the 55 Bar (Sunnyside, 2021)
 Theo Bleckmann & The Westerlies: This Land  (Westerlies, 2021)
 Tim Berne's Snakeoil: The Deceptive 4  (Intakt, 2020)
 Paul Moravec & Oratorio Society of New York: Sanctuary Road (Naxos, 2020)
 Nir Felder: II  (Ropeadope, 2020)
 Ben Monder: Day After Day  (Sunnyside, 2019)
 Sylvie Courvoisier & Mary Halvorson: Crop Circles  (Relative Pitch, 2018)
 Steve Lehman: Sélébéyone  (Pi Recordings, 2016)
 The Cellar and Point: Ambit (Cuneiform, 2014)
 Ben Monder: Hydra  (Sunnyside, 2013)
 Tim Berne's Snakeoil: Shadow Man  (ECM, 2013)
 Son Lux: Lanterns (Joyful Noise, 2013)
 Nels Cline, Jim Black, and Tim Berne: Shadow Man (Crytogramophone, 2010)

References

External links 
 official website
 greyfade
 greyfade studio
 joseph branciforte at allmusic

1985 births
Living people
American electronic musicians
American experimental musicians
Berklee College of Music alumni